Przemysław Oziębała (born August 24, 1986) is a Polish professional footballer who plays for Raków Częstochowa II.

Career
In February 2007, he moved to Zagłębie Sosnowiec. In the winter 2008, he joined Widzew Łódź on a five-year contract deal.

In July 2012, he agreed a three-year deal with Górnik Zabrze.

References

External links
 

1986 births
Living people
Polish footballers
Widzew Łódź players
Zagłębie Sosnowiec players
Górnik Zabrze players
Siarka Tarnobrzeg players
Raków Częstochowa players
Stal Stalowa Wola players
Ekstraklasa players
I liga players
II liga players
III liga players
People from Myszków County
Sportspeople from Silesian Voivodeship
Association football wingers
Association football forwards